Tasneem Zehra Husain is a Pakistani theoretical physicist. She is one of few Pakistani women to obtain a doctorate in physics, and the first Pakistani woman string theorist.  An eminent scientist, she has been a guest speaker at a various schools and colleges in an effort to promote science and technology in Pakistan.

Husain has represented Pakistan at the Meeting of Nobel Laureates in Lindau, Germany and led the Pakistan team to the World Year of Physics (WYP) Launch Conference in Paris. In 2013, Husain was invited by the Cambridge Science Festival to be the moderator for a panel of eminent scientists, including National Academy of Sciences member and Harvard Medical School Professor, George M. Church, Pulitzer prize winner, Amy D. Marcus and MIT Professor and National Medal of Science winner, Sallie Chisholm.

In November 2014, Husain released her first novel, "Only the Longest Threads." Kirkus Reviews described the novel as, "A fictional approach to physics that captures both the substance of the theory and the passion of its practitioners."

Biography

Early life
Husain received her early education in Lahore. At the age of eleven, Husain dropped out of a regular school and was home schooled. Husain sat for her O Levels (privately, through the British Council) at the age of 13 and went on to take her A Levels at the age of 15. During these years, Husain wrote extensively. Her articles were featured in various national newspapers as well as the magazine Newsline. In 1988, she won an international essay competition held by the
Children as the Peacemakers Foundation based in California, USA. In 1990, she won First Prize in an essay competition held by the Pakistan Post Office. In an interview given to the Dawn news, Husain has been misquoted as saying that this 'isolation' created problems for her at Kinnaird College, when she went there for her under-graduate education.  In fact, she was an active participant in many extra-curricular activities and represented her college at inter-school competitions both for poetry recitation and science. Upon graduation, Husain received the Boswell Medal for excellence which is awarded to students who excel academically and are also exceptionally well-rounded.

Education
Husain attended Kinnaird College in Lahore where she obtained her Bachelor of Science (BSc) in Mathematics and Physics. This was followed by a Master of Science (M.S.) in Physics from the Quaid-i-Azam University in Islamabad. She then went to Trieste, Italy on a scholarship awarded by the Abdus Salam International Centre for Theoretical Physics (ICTP) for a yearlong post-graduate degree in the field of High-Energy Physics. Husain obtained her PhD in Theoretical Physics from Stockholm University in 2003, after which she went to Harvard University for a two-year-long post-doctoral research position.

Husain in Europe
After the ICTP, Husain moved to Sweden to attend Stockholm University where her thesis advisor was Ansar Fayyazuddin. She completed her PhD in theoretical physics at the age of twenty six, becoming the first Pakistani woman String Theorist.

Career in physics
After her post-doctoral stint at Harvard University, Husain moved back to Pakistan, where she joined the Lahore University of Management Sciences's School of Science and Engineering. She became an Assistant Professor of Physics.  Husain's academic research focuses on using 11-dimensional supergravity to arrive at a classification of the flux backgrounds that arise when M-branes wrap supersymmetric cycles.

Advocate for science in Pakistan

Husain has become a vocal and vehement supporter of science in Pakistan. Keenly interested in education and science popularisation in her country, she designed Pakistan's logo for the World Year of Physics (WYP) and was an active participant in the WYP Physics Stories project, led by Argonne National Laboratory of the United States.

Husain has made contemporary efforts to make basic theoretical physics accessible to high-school students, and has developed a series of animated presentations which she delivered to various high school and college students. Husain has also taught both Mathematics and Physics at her alma mater, Kinnaird College. She has helped train Pakistan's physics team to the International Physics Olympiad. Husain is a trustee and board of directors of the Alif Laila Book Bus Society, a non-profit educational institution catering primarily to under-privileged children.

Notes and references

External resources

External links

Pakistani women physicists
Harvard Fellows
Punjabi academics
Pakistani scholars
Pakistani string theorists
Pakistani women scientists
Pakistani emigrants to the United States
Quaid-i-Azam University alumni
Academic staff of Lahore University of Management Sciences
Stockholm University alumni
Year of birth missing (living people)
Living people
Punjabi people
Pakistani women academics
Kinnaird College for Women University alumni
Scientists from Lahore
21st-century women scientists